Paramolgula is a genus of marine tunicates.

Species
 Paramolgula canioi Monniot & Monniot, 1983
 Paramolgula chilensis Hartmeyer, 1914
 Paramolgula filholi (Pizon, 1898)
 Paramolgula gregaria (Lesson, 1830)

Species names currently considered to be synonyms:
 Paramolgula arctica Bonnevie, 1896: synonym of Eugyra glutinans (Moeller, 1842) 
 Paramolgula gigantea (Cunningham, 1871): synonym of Paramolgula gregaria (Lesson, 1830) 
 Paramolgula guttula Michaelsen, 1900: synonym of Eugyra kerguelenensis Herdman, 1881 
 Paramolgula horrida (Herdman, 1881): synonym of Paramolgula gregaria (Lesson, 1830) 
 Paramolgula patagonica Michaelsen, 1900: synonym of Paramolgula gregaria (Lesson, 1830) 
 Paramolgula rara Kiaer, 1896: synonym of Eugyra glutinans (Moeller, 1842) 
 Paramolgula schulzei Traustedt, 1885: synonym of Paramolgula gregaria (Lesson, 1830) 
 Paramolgula symetrica (Drasche, 1884): synonym of Eugyra symmetrica Drasche, 1884 
 Paramolgula symmetrica (Drasche, 1884): synonym of Eugyra symmetrica Drasche, 1884 
 Paramolgula villosa (Pizon, 1898): synonym of Paramolgula gregaria (Lesson, 1830)

References

Stolidobranchia
Tunicate genera